Throughout the history of Jehovah's Witnesses, their beliefs, doctrines, policies and practices have engendered controversy and opposition from governments, communities, and religious groups. Many Christian denominations consider their doctrines to be heretical, and some religious leaders have labeled Jehovah's Witnesses a cult. Members of the denomination have also met with objection from governments for refusing to serve in the military, particularly in times of war. Many individuals consider their door-to-door preaching to be intrusive. These issues have led to persecution of Jehovah's Witnesses in various countries, including the United States.

Political and religious animosity against the Witnesses has occasionally led to mob action and government oppression. According to former United States Solicitor General, Archibald Cox, Jehovah's Witnesses in the United States were "the principal victims of religious persecution ... in the twentieth century," and added that, "they began to attract attention and provoke repression in the 1930s, when their proselytizing and numbers rapidly increased."

Negative attitudes towards Jehovah's Witnesses
In his 1964 study of prejudice toward minorities, Seymour Martin Lipset found that the Jehovah's Witnesses were among the most disliked of all religious minorities he researched; 41% of respondents expressed open dislike of them. In 1984, authors Merlin Brinkerhoff and Marlene Mackie concluded that after the so-called new cults, Jehovah's Witnesses were among the least accepted religious groups in the United States.

Background 

In the 1910s and 1920s, the Watch Tower Society, then associated with the Bible Student movement, was outspoken in its statements against other religious groups and of the Catholic Church in particular. The Bible Students believed religion to be a "racket and a snare" and refused to be identified as a specific denomination for some time. It was not uncommon for members to carry placards outside churches and in the streets, proclaiming the imminent destruction of church members along with church and government institutions if they did not flee from "false religion". The Watch Tower Society's 1917 book, The Finished Mystery, stated, "Also, in the year 1918, when God destroys the churches wholesale and the church members by millions, it shall be that any that escape shall come to the works of Pastor Russell to learn the meaning of the downfall of 'Christianity'."

Citing The Finished Mystery, the United States federal government indicted the Watch Tower Society's board of directors for violating the Espionage Act on May 7, 1918 for condemning the war effort. They were found guilty and sentenced to 20 years imprisonment; however, in March 1919, the judgment against them was reversed, and they were released from prison. The charges were later dropped. Patriotic fervor during World War I fueled persecution of the Bible Students both in America and in Europe.

In 1917, following the death of Charles Taze Russell—the founder of the Bible Student movement—Joseph Franklin Rutherford became president of the Watch Tower Society, and a leadership dispute within the society ensued; those who remained associated with the society became known as Jehovah's witnesses in 1931.

1930s and 1940s 
During the late 1930s and the 1940s, Jehovah's Witnesses attacked the Roman Catholic Church and other Christian denominations so vigorously that many states and municipalities passed laws against their inflammatory preaching.

World War II 

During World War II, Witnesses experienced mob violence in America because they were perceived as being against the war effort.

Pledge of Allegiance

In 1935, Rutherford proscribed flag salutes, stating them to be a form of idolatry "contrary to the Word of God." This stance drew mob violence against Witnesses and many children of Witnesses were expelled from public schools. The Witnesses' apparent lack of patriotism angered local authorities, the American Legion, and others, resulting in vigilante violence during World War II. Men, women and children were injured and in some cases killed in mob attacks.

In 1940, the case of Minersville School District v. Gobitis received publicity in a lower federal court. The US Supreme Court ruled in an 8–1 decision that a school district's interest in creating national unity was sufficient to allow them to require that students salute the flag. After the court's decision in the Gobitis case, a new wave of persecution of Witnesses began across the nation. Lillian Gobitas later characterized the violence as "open season on Jehovah's Witnesses." The American Civil Liberties Union recorded 1,488 attacks on Witnesses in over 300 communities between May and October 1940. Angry mobs assaulted Witnesses, destroyed their property, boycotted their businesses and vandalized their places of worship. Less than a week after the court decision, a Kingdom Hall in Kennebunk, Maine was burnt down.

American Legion posts harassed Witnesses nationwide. At Klamath Falls, Oregon, members of the American Legion harassed Witnesses assembled for worship with requests to salute the flag and buy war bonds. They then attacked the Witnesses and besieged the meeting place, breaking windows, throwing in stink bombs, ammonia and burning kerosene rags. The Witnesses' cars were disabled and many were overturned. The governor was compelled to call the state militia to disperse the mob, which reached 1,000 at its peak. In Texas, Witness missionaries were chased and beaten by vigilantes, and their literature was confiscated or burned.

First Lady Eleanor Roosevelt appealed publicly for calm, and newspaper editorials and the American legal community condemned the Gobitas decision as a blow to liberty. Several justices signaled their belief that the case had been "wrongly decided." On June 16, 1940, in an effort to dispel the mob action, the United States Attorney General, Francis Biddle, stated on a nationwide radio broadcast:

In 1943, after a drawn-out litigation process by Watch Tower Society lawyers in state courts and lower federal courts, the Supreme Court reversed its previous decision, ruling that public school officials could not force Jehovah's Witnesses and other students to salute the flag and recite the Pledge of Allegiance.

See also
 Persecution of Jehovah's Witnesses in Canada
 United States Supreme Court cases involving Jehovah's Witnesses

References

Further reading
 The Persecution of Jehovah's Witnesses: The Record of Violence Against a Religious Organization Unparalleled in America Since the Attack on the Mormons., American Civil Liberties Union, New York, 1941

United States
Freedom of religion in the United States